Railway Gazette International is a monthly business magazine and news website covering the railway, metro, light rail and tram industries worldwide. Available by annual subscription, the magazine is read in over 140 countries by transport professionals and decision makers, railway managers, engineers, consultants and suppliers to the rail industry. A mix of technical, commercial and geographical feature articles, plus the regular monthly news pages, cover developments in all aspects of the rail industry, including infrastructure, operations, rolling stock and signalling.

History
Railway Gazette International traces its history to May 1835 as The Railway Magazine, when it was founded by Effingham Wilson. The Railway Gazette title dates from July 1905, created to cover railway commercial and financial affairs. In April 1914 it merged with The Railway Times, which incorporated Herapath's Railway Journal, and in February 1935 it absorbed the Railway Engineer. Around this time it also absorbed The Railway News. It then reflected all aspects of railway activity, particularly in the British Empire and in other areas of the world which used similar technology.

In January 1964, it merged with sister publication Diesel Railway Traction and its frequency reduced from weekly to fortnightly.

In October 1970, it was renamed Railway Gazette International and reduced in frequency to monthly.

Railway Gazette International is part of the Railway Gazette Group, itself part of DVV Media Group. It was part of Reed Business Information until 1 April 2007.

Frequency
Railway Gazette International is published monthly and Metro Report International twice a year.

Railway Gazette Group
The Railway Gazette Group publishes Railway Gazette International, covering news and features about railways around the world, as well as some urban transport news. Metro Report International is focused on urban transport. Railway Gazette China covers mainline and urban railway news, and is published in Mandarin, while Rail Business UK covers the railway industry in the United Kingdom.

References

External links

1835 establishments in England
Monthly magazines published in the United Kingdom
Magazines established in 1835
Rail transport magazines published in the United Kingdom